Raylectron is a rendering engine used as an extension for Trimble SketchUp, a 3D computer graphics software.

Raylectron was born in 2010 by SoftByte Labs, Inc. a software developer based in Manitoba, Canada.

Raylectron uses advanced techniques based on the path tracing algorithm and largely modified for speed while retaining photo-realism provided by path tracing. Raylectron differ from conventional rendering engine as it does not use approximation and/or emulation, a trade-off for speed widely used by most rendering engines.

It is also capable of doing rendered animation of the scenes either created directly in Raylectron or from the SketchUp scenes.

The use of the Raylectron instancing (or proxies as some call it) can produce extremely large models using very little memory. The Raylectron instancing capability is widely used by landscape designiner such as for trees, bushes and other objects. One unique capability is that each instances can be individually rotated and scalled, producing a different look using a single instance of an object.

Raylectron not only runs on the CPU but also support real-time GPU rendering using OpenCL and is compatible with Nvidia and AMD video cards.

External links 
- Raylectron Video Tutorials
- Raylectron rendering gallery

3D graphics software
Rendering systems
Global illumination software